Hermann Pauly (18 July 1870 – 31 October 1950) was a German chemist and inventor. He is known for the Pauly reaction, a chemical test used for detecting the presence of tyrosine or histidine in proteins.

Early years
Hermann Pauly was born in Deutz (now part of Cologne) on 18 July 1870. His father was Friedrich Hermann Pauly, a mine director, and his mother was Henriette Wintgens (or Wittgens). He graduated from the Adolfinum Moers Hermann secondary school, then studied natural sciences at the University of Giessen in Hesse, Leipzig University and the Rheinische Friedrich-Wilhelms University of Bonn. He became a member of the Corps Teutonia Bonn in 1890. He studied chemistry under Richard Anschütz in Bonn, and gained a PhD in 1894.

Career
Pauly worked for a short period at Schering AG in Berlin, then became a research assistant to Hermann Emil Fischer at the Friedrich-Wilhelms-Universität.  He then became a teaching assistant to Rudolf Nietzki at the University of Basel. He returned to Bonn, where he qualified as a professor in 1901. In 1904, he joined Albrecht Kossel at Heidelberg University. Pauly studied for his habilitation at the University of Würzburg, and was appointed an assistant professor in 1909.  In 1912 he joined a private laboratory. In 1918 he was appointed a full Professor at Würzburg. Pauly became a member of the Corpsschleifenträger der Lusatia Leipzig in 1922. Hermann Pauly was awarded an honorary doctorate in medicine in 1932. He died in Würzburg on 31 October 1950.

Work
Pauly published 71 papers on organic chemistry and physiological chemistry and filed at least 14 patents related to pharmaceutical products, fragrances and antiseptic preparations. He correctly confirmed the finding of Thomas Aldrich that the formula for adrenaline was C9H13NO3 despite the fact that he was not working with pure samples, which only emerged much later. Pauly spent many years studying the diazo-reactions of proteins. In 1904 he published a paper that described what became known as the Pauly reaction, a method of detecting the presence of the amino acids tyrosine or histidine in proteins. In 1915 Pauly used diazo-benzene arsinic acid rather than diazo-benzene sulphonic acid to prepare an insoluble diazo-compound.  He found that a tyrosine ring took on two molecules of the diazo-compound to form a bis-diazo-tyrosine. A histidine ring did the same. These discoveries proved invaluable to the work of Karl Landsteiner on immunity and allergy.

Publications

Notes

Sources

1870 births
1950 deaths
20th-century German chemists
Scientists from Cologne
University of Giessen alumni
Leipzig University alumni
University of Bonn alumni
Academic staff of the University of Bonn
Academic staff of Heidelberg University
Academic staff of the University of Würzburg